Huang Shu-kuang is a Taiwanese admiral, who served as the Chief of the General Staff of the Republic of China Armed Forces after the decease of General Shen Yi-ming.

Military career 
In the mid-2000s, Huang was the commander of the Republic of China Navy's  submarine fleet. He next served as the ROCN's chief of staff. Huang then led the ROCN's Fleet Command. Soon after his appointment as commander of the Republic of China Navy, Huang, defense minister Feng Shih-kuan, and other military officers apologized for the killing of a dog on a military base. Soon after this incident, the Hsiung Feng III missile mishap occurred, followed by another round of apologies, during which he visited the home of Huang Wen-chung, the only victim of the incident, twice, first with Feng, and then with president Tsai Ing-wen. On the date of the incident, Huang was given a demerit. In April 2017, Tsai issued Huang Shu-kang a warning, because naval officers had agreed to a contract the previous July to acquire Raytheon Phalanx closed-in weapons systems before the Legislative Yuan passed a budget to purchase them. 

Huang is a graduate of the Republic of China Naval Academy class of 1979, and took courses in the  National Defense University, such as the Naval Command and Staff in 1992, and the  Strategic Command Course in 2001. 

In March 2017, Huang represented the ROCN in signing a memorandum of understanding with  CSBC Corp., Taiwan and the National Chung-Shan Institute of Science and Technology for the latter two organizations to develop and build submarines for Taiwan's navy. Huang received two admonitions in November 2017, following legal action against Ching Fu Shipbuilding Co. chief executive officer Chien Liang-chien, who stood accused of fraud relating to a contract signed with the ROCN in October 2014. In October 2018, Huang was appointed convener of a task force formed to oversee development of an "Indigenous Defense Submarine."

In August 2018, Huang apologized to the family of Huang Kuo-chang, who died in June 1995 while serving in the Republic of China Navy. 

On 15 January 2020, Huang was appointed and promoted as the Chief of the General Staff, succeeding Adm. Liu Chih-pin, who had taken over on an acting basis after the death of the last Chief of the General Staff Gen. Shen Yi-ming in a helicopter crash.

Awards
  Order of the Cloud and Banner
  Order of Loyalty and Diligence
  A-First Class, Medal of Victorious Garrison
  Medal of Naval Brilliance
  Medal of Naval Merits
  Medal of Naval Distinguished Service

Personal life
Huang’s ancestral home was in Xiangtan, Hunan. His family move to Taiwan after Chinese Civil War. He has a younger sister Huang Shan-shan who is a politician and a serving Deputy Mayor of Taipei City.

Footnotes

Living people
Republic of China Navy admirals
1957 births